Let Them Be Little is the seventh studio album by American country music singer Billy Dean. His first album since Real Man seven years previous, it is also his first release on Curb Records. The album was originally to have been released in 2003, on View 2 Records, which promoted the first two singles ("I'm in Love with You" and a cover of John Denver's "Thank God I'm a Country Boy"). Asylum-Curb promoted the third single, "Let Them Be Little", which was co-written by Richie McDonald, lead singer of Lonestar, and recorded by the band on their 2004 album Let's Be Us Again. After this song came "This Is the Life", "Race You to the Bottom" and "Swinging for the Fence". Also included on the album are re-recordings of "Somewhere in My Broken Heart" and "Billy the Kid", two of Dean's early singles from 1991 and 1992.

Dean produced the entire album, working with Lari White on tracks 3-7 and Ray Barnette for the rest.

Track listing

Personnel
Tim Akers- keyboards, organ, piano
Ray Barnette- bass guitar, background vocals
Mike Brignardello- bass guitar
Sam Bush- mandolin
Billy Dean- acoustic guitar, lead vocals, background vocals
Glen Duncan- fiddle, mandolin
Stuart Duncan- fiddle
Shannon Forrest- drums
Paul Franklin- steel guitar
David Harvey- mandolin
Aubrey Haynie- fiddle
Kevin Haynie- banjo
Wes Hightower- background vocals
Joe Hogue- keyboards, programming 
Jim Hoke- harmonica
John Barlow Jarvis- piano
Jeff King- electric guitar
Paul Leim- drums
Jerry McPherson- electric guitar 
Dan Needham- drums
Kim Parent- background vocals
Marcia Ramirez- background vocals
Michael Rhodes- bass guitar
Matt Rollings- piano
Scotty Sanders- steel guitar
Marty Slayton- background vocals
Bryan Sutton- acoustic guitar
Biff Watson- acoustic guitar
John Willis- acoustic guitar, electric guitar
Jonathan Yudkin- fiddle

Chart performance

References
Allmusic

2005 albums
Billy Dean albums
Curb Records albums
Albums produced by Lari White